Medimont is an unincorporated community in Kootenai County, Idaho, United States. Medimont has a post office with ZIP code 83842.

The Trail of the Coeur d'Alenes bicycle trail passes through Medimont.

History
Medimont's population was 162 in 1909, and was 50 in 1960.

Historic places
From the National Register of Historic Places listings in Kootenai County, Idaho
 Cave Lake School
 Indian Springs School II

References

Unincorporated communities in Kootenai County, Idaho
Unincorporated communities in Idaho